Townwood is an unincorporated community in Putnam County, in the U.S. state of Ohio.

History
Townwood was platted in 1886. A post office called Townwood was established in 1891, and remained in operation until it was discontinued in 1926.

References

Unincorporated communities in Putnam County, Ohio
Unincorporated communities in Ohio